Abū Yaʿqūb Isḥāq ibn Sulaymān ibn ʿAlī al-Hāshimī was an 8th–9th-century AD Abbasid prince and historian. He held several official positions during his lifetime, including the governorships of Sind, Egypt, and Arminiyah.

Career
Ishaq was a member of a collateral branch of the Abbasid royal dynasty, being a first cousin of the first two Abbasid caliphs al-Saffah and al-Mansur. His father, Sulayman ibn Ali, had been a senior member of the family during his lifetime and had held the important governorship of Basra during the initial years following the Abbasid Revolution. He was also connected to the ruling line by his marriage to Aliyah, the daughter of al-Mansur and an Umayyad woman.

During the caliphates of al-Mahdi, Harun al-Rashid, and al-Amin Ishaq was posted to various provinces throughout the empire. In 776/7 he was appointed as governor of Mosul, and in 786–787 he was in charge of Medina. According to some sources he oversaw the summer raid (sa'ifa) against the Byzantines in 787/8 or 788/9, either leading it himself or dispatching Yazid ibn Anbasah al-Harashi to conduct it on his behalf. In 790/1 he was governor of Sind and Makran.

In 793 Ishaq was appointed as governor of Egypt. While there, he attempted to increase taxes on the local sharecroppers (muzari'un), which provoked the residents of the Hawf district to rise up in revolt. After Ishaq requested reinforcements from the caliph, the general Harthamah ibn A'yan arrived in Egypt with a large army and forced the rebels to submit. A short time afterwards Ishaq was dismissed in favor of Harthamah, having held the governorship for about a year.

In 795 Ishaq was appointed to his father's old power base at Basra. Around 809/10 he was the governor of Homs, but after a series of disturbances forced him to retreat from the city to Salamiyah he was dismissed and replaced with Abdallah ibn Sa'id al-Harashi.

By around 811/2 Ishaq was appointed by al-Amin as governor of Arminiyah, with his son al-Fadl serving as his deputy there. Following the commencement of the civil war between al-Amin and al-Ma'mun he decided to take a stand in the province and oppose al-Ma'mun's lieutenant Tahir ibn Muhammad al-San'ani, who had been sent to seize Arminiyah and Adharbayjan on behalf of his patron. After gathering the support of several local notables he set out for Barda, but was soon met by a large force led by Zuhayr ibn Sinan al-Tamimi that al-San'ani had dispatched against him. Following a battle that lasted for the greater part of a day Ishaq and his supporters were defeated, while his son Ja'far was captured and sent as a prisoner to al-Ma'mun.

According to al-Baghdadi, Ishaq died in Baghdad at an unspecified date.

Notes

References
 

 
 
 
 
 
 
  
 
 

8th-century births
9th-century deaths
Abbasid governors of Egypt
Abbasid governors of Sind
Abbasid governors of Basra
Abbasids
8th-century Abbasid governors of Egypt
9th-century people from the Abbasid Caliphate
Abbasid governors of Medina
Abbasid governors of Mosul
8th-century Arabs